The Arabian trident bat (Asellia arabica) is a species of Old World leaf-nosed bat found in the Middle East.

Taxonomy and etymology
The Arabian trident bat was described as a new species in 2011. It was distinguished as a result of a taxonomic split in the trident bat, A. tridens. The holotype was collected in 2005 in the Al Mahrah Governorate of Yemen. Its species name "arabica" is derived from the Arabian Peninsula where it is found.

Description
The fur of its back is beige or a pale, brownish-gray. The fur may have a yellowish or faint rusty tint. Its belly fur is paler than its back fur. Its flight membranes are also a pale, brownish-gray.

Range and status
It is found in the Middle East, with documented occurrence in southwestern Oman and southeastern Yemen. As of 2017, it is evaluated as a data deficient species by the IUCN. There is no estimate of its population size.

References

Bats of the Arabian Peninsula
Mammals described in 2011
Asellia